Ildikó Tóth may refer to:

 Ildikó Tóth (water polo), Hungarian water polo player
 Ildikó Tóth (actress), Hungarian actress